The Central Military Commission (CMC) is the highest party organ in Vietnam on military policy. Its membership includes some members of the Politburo and military leaders. The CMC is headed by the current General Secretary of the Communist Party of Vietnam, Nguyễn Phú Trọng.

The Statute of the Communist Party of Vietnam says that the Vietnam People's Army (VPA) is "under the party's absolute, direct, comprehensive leadership". The membership of the CMC is appointed by the Central Committee. The CMC is responsible to the Party's Politburo and the Secretariat. Its main priority is to supervise party affairs within the VPA, from the very bottom to the top, which is represented by the General Political Department. Since the end of the Vietnam War in 1975, the norm has been that at least two VPA generals are to be represented in the Party's Politburo, however, beginning in 1975 the number of VPA generals represented in the Central Committee has slowly decreased. The VPA has played a big role in economic development; in 1993 VPA generals held five out of thirty-three ministries. Because of the army's role in economic development, the Ministry of Defence established the General Directorate for Economic Development.

For the heads of the commission, see Secretary of the Central Military Commission.

The Commission publishes the People's Army Newspaper together with the Ministry of National Defence.

Central Military Commission (2020–2025)

References

Citations

Sources 

 Works cited
 

Military of Vietnam
Politics of Vietnam
Central Military Commission of the Communist Party of Vietnam
Vietnam